Omar Edwards (born 30 May 1980) is a Jamaican football coach, former manager of the Turks and Caicos Islands.

Coaching career
In 2004, Edwards was appointed under-20 coach of Boys' Town, before moving up to coaching the club's under-21 team. Edwards later was named assistant head coach of Boys' Town. In 2010, Edwards joined the coaching staff at Jamaica's U17 side, before leaving in 2017.

From 2016 to 2019, Edwards was manager of the top flight Jamaica National Premier League club Tivoli Gardens. In March 2019, Edwards was appointed manager of the Turks and Caicos Islands.

Managerial statistics

References

1980 births
Living people
People from Clarendon Parish, Jamaica
Jamaican football managers
Turks and Caicos Islands national football team managers
Jamaican expatriate sportspeople
Jamaican expatriate sportspeople in British Overseas Territories
Expatriate football managers in the Turks and Caicos Islands
Jamaican emigrants to the Turks and Caicos Islands
Association football coaches